Achillea glaberrima is a species of yarrow in the family Asteraceae, native to southeastern Ukraine. A cultivar, 'Gold Spray', is available.

References

glaberrima
Endemic flora of Ukraine
Plants described in 1926